Heth, sometimes written Chet, but more accurately Ḥet, is the eighth letter of the Semitic abjads, including Phoenician Ḥēt 𐤇 , Hebrew Ḥēth , Aramaic Ḥēth , Syriac Ḥēṯ ܚ, Arabic Ḥā' , and Maltese Ħ, ħ.

Heth originally represented a voiceless fricative, either pharyngeal , or  velar . In Arabic, two corresponding letters were created for both phonemic sounds: unmodified   represents , while   represents .

The Phoenician letter gave rise to the Greek eta , Etruscan , Latin H, and Cyrillic И. While H is a consonant in the Latin alphabet, the Greek and Cyrillic equivalents represent vowel sounds, though the letter was originally a consonant in Greek and this usage later evolved into the rough breathing character.

Origins
The shape of the letter Ḥet ultimately goes back either to the Egyptian hieroglyph for 'courtyard' (ḥwt): O6 (compare Hebrew חָצֵר ḥatser of identical meaning, which begins with Ḥet) or to the one for 'thread, wick' representing a wick of twisted flax: (ḥ) V28 (compare Hebrew חוּט ḥut of identical meaning, which begins with Ḥet).
Possibly named  in the Proto-Sinaitic script.

The corresponding South Arabian letters are   ḥ and   ḫ, corresponding to the Ge'ez letters  ሐ and  ኀ.

This letter is usually transcribed as ḥ, h with a dot underneath. In some romanization systems, a (capital) Ch is also used. The latter method has the advantage of being easy to type on a computer.

Arabic ḥāʾ

The letter is named   and is the sixth letter of the alphabet. Its shape varies depending on its position in the word:

This form is used to denote two letters, the second being  ḫāʾ.

Pronunciation
In Arabic,  is similar to the English , but it is much "raspier", IPA: ~. (Pharyngeal H)

Hebrew Chet

Hebrew spelling:

Pronunciation
In Modern Israeli Hebrew (and Ashkenazi Hebrew, although not under strict pronunciation), the letter Ḥet usually has the sound value of a voiceless uvular fricative, as the historical phonemes of the letters  ח and  כ merged, both becoming the voiceless uvular fricative.
  
In more rare phonologies, it is pronounced as a voiceless pharyngeal fricative and is still among Mizrahi Jews (especially among the older generation and popular Mizrahi singers, mostly Yemenite Jews), in accordance with oriental Jewish traditions (see, e.g., Mizrahi Hebrew and Yemenite Hebrew).

Ḥet is one of the few Hebrew consonants that can take a vowel at the end of a word. This occurs when patach gnuva comes under the Ḥet at the end of the word.

Variations
Ḥet, along with Aleph, Ayin, Resh, and He, cannot receive a dagesh. As pharyngeal fricatives are difficult for most English speakers to pronounce, loanwords are usually Anglicized to have .

Significance
In gematria, Ḥet represents the number eight.

In chat rooms, online forums, and social networking the letter Ḥet repeated (חחחחחחחחחח) denotes laughter, just as in English, in the saying 'Haha'.

Character encodings

See also
Ħ, ħ : H with stroke

References

External links

Phoenician alphabet
Arabic letters
Hebrew letters